The 2009 Copa Venezuela was the 40th staging of the Copa Venezuela.

The competition started on September 2, 2009 and concluded on December 2, 2009 with a two leg final, in which Caracas FC won the trophy for the fifth time with a 3-0 win away and a 1-0 win at home over Trujillanos FC.

First round
The matches were played on 2–3 September 2009.

|}

Second round
One leg - 2A/2B Division Teams v/s 1 Division Teams. The matches were played on 5–6 September 2009.

|}

Two legs - 1 Division Teams v/s 1 Division Teams. The matches were played on 5-9 September 2009.

|}

Third round
The matches were played on 16–30 September 2009.

|}

Quarterfinals
The matches were played on 7 October–4 November 2009.

|}

Semifinals
The matches were played on 11–18 November 2009.

|}

Finals
The matches were played on 25 November–2 December 2009.

|}

NB: Caracas FC qualify to Copa Sudamericana 2010 as cup winners

External links
RSSSF.com
Soccerway.com

Copa Venezuela
2009–10 in Venezuelan football
2009 domestic association football cups